The Women's 50 metre freestyle competition of the 2016 FINA World Swimming Championships (25 m) was held on 10 and 11 December 2016.

Records
Prior to the competition, the existing world and championship records were as follows.

Results

Heats
The heats were held at 11:28.

Semifinals
The semifinals were held at 19:16.

Semifinal 1

Semifinal 2

Final
The Final was held at 20:02.

References

Women's 50 metre freestyle